Li Jinghao (born July 1961) is a Chinese politician of Korean ethnicity. He is the head of the Jilin Provincial United Front Work Department and a member of the Standing Committee of the CPC Jilin Provincial Committee. He entered the workforce in August 1983 and joined the Communist Party of China in March 1989.

Biography
Li was born in Antu County, Jilin, China in July 1961. In September 1979, he entered Jilin Engineering Institute (now ), where he graduated in August 1983. He also obtained his Bachelor's degree in Management Economics from Nanyang Technological University in May 2004.

After university, he was assigned to Yanbian Korean Autonomous Prefecture as an official. In November 2000 he became the Deputy Communist Party Secretary of Longjing, rising to Communist Party Secretary the next year. He served as Deputy Mayor of Yanbian Korean Autonomous Prefecture in February 2007, and six years later promoted to the Mayor position. In May 2017 he was appointed the head of the Jilin Provincial United Front Work Department and a member of the Standing Committee of the CPC Jilin Provincial Committee. 

He was a member of the 12th National People's Congress. He is an alternate member of the 19th Central Committee of the Communist Party of China.

References

1961 births
Living people
People from Antu County
Changchun University of Technology alumni
Nanyang Technological University alumni
People's Republic of China politicians from Jilin
Chinese Communist Party politicians from Jilin
Delegates to the 12th National People's Congress